Pay the Butler (20 February 1984 – 1991) was an American Thoroughbred racehorse best known for winning the 1988 Japan Cup. Bred in Kentucky, he began his racing career in France and won two of his seventeen starts before moving back to the United States as a four-year-old in the spring of 1988. He won the Red Smith Handicap on his North American debut and in November he defeated a top-class international field in the Japan Cup. He remained in training for two further seasons and ran well in several major contests but recorded only one minor win. He was retired to stud in Japan but died in 1991 after one season as a breeding stallion.

Background
Pay the Butler was a bay horse bred in Kentucky by Robin Scully's Clovelly Farm. He was sired by the French stallion Val de l'Orne who won the Prix du Jockey Club in 1975. His other progeny included the Queen's Plate winners Golden Choice and La Lorgnette as well as the Hollywood Derby winner Victory Zone. Pay The Butler's dam Princess Morvi produced several other winners including River God (also by Val de l'Orne) who won the Queen's Vase and finished third in the St Leger. She was a descendant of the influential French broodmare L'Esperance. As a yearling, the colt was offered for sale at Keeneland in September 1985 but failed to reach his reserve price of $20,000.

Racing career

1986 & 1987: two- and three-year-old seasons
As a two-year-old, Pay the Butler raced in France and failed to win in five races although he finished third in the Listed Prix Herbager at Maisons-Laffitte Racecourse. In the following year was unplaced in eight of his nine races but recorded his first victory when he won the Listed Grand Prix de Strasbourg on 28 May.

1988: four-year-old season
In the early part of 1988, Pay the Butler raced three times in France, winning a handicap race at Longchamp Racecourse on April 4 and was then sent to the United States to be trained by Robert J. Frankel. On his first appearance for his new trainer Pay the Butler contested the Grade II Red Smith Handicap over ten furlongs at Belmont Park on May 28 and won by a neck from Equalize. He continued to run well in the United States, finishing second in both the Bowling Green Handicap and the Man o' War Stakes before running unplaced in the Canadian International Stakes on October 16.

Pay the Butler was sent to Japan to contest the eighth running of the Japan Cup at Tokyo Racecourse on November and started at odds of 13.9/1 in a fourteen-runner field. There was a strong European contingent comprising Tony Bin from Italy, Moon Madness and Shady Heights (International Stakes) from Britain and Kondor (Preis von Europa, Aral-Pokal) from Germany. The other North American contenders were Salem Drive (Gulfstream Park Turf Handicap) and My Big Boy (Bernard Baruch Handicap) whilst the Southern hemisphere was represented by the New Zealand-bred gelding Bonecrusher. The best of the "home team" appeared to be Tamamo Cross, who started favourite after wins in the Takarazuka Kinen and the Tenno Sho and the three-year-old Oguri Cap. Ridden by Chris McCarron, Pay the Butler won by half a length from Tamamo Cross, with Oguri Cap taking third just ahead of My Big Boy, Tony Bin and Moon Madness.

On his final appearance of the year, Pay the Butler finished sixth behind the Breeders' Cup Turf winner Great Communicator in the Hollywood Turf Cup Stakes at Hollywood Park Racetrack on December 24.

1989: five-year-old season
Pay the Butler failed to win in nine starts as a five-year-old in 1989 but ran well in several major turf races. He finished second in the Pan American Handicap and the Oak Tree Invitational Stakes as well as running third in the John Henry Handicap and the Bowling Green Handicap. On his final start of the year he attempted to repeat his 1988 success in the Japan Cup. He was gain ridden by McCarron and finished third of the fifteen runners behind Horlicks and Oguri Cap.

1990: six-year-old season
Pay the Butler began his 1990 campaign by winning an allowance race at Hollywood Park in May but failed to make any impact in five subsequent races. On his final appearance he finished fourth in an allowance at Hollywood in November.

Stud record
Pay the Butler was retired from racing to become a breeding stallion in Japan but died in 1991 after one season at stud. The best of his only crop of foals was Pal Bright, a mare who recorded Grade III wins in the Niigata Kinen and the Hakodate Kinen.

Pedigree

References 

1984 racehorse births
1991 racehorse deaths
Racehorses bred in Kentucky
Racehorses trained in France
Racehorses trained in the United States
Thoroughbred family 9-e
Japan Cup winners